Ladbroke Grove is a London Underground station on the Circle and Hammersmith & City lines, between Latimer Road and Westbourne Park stations, and in Travelcard Zone 2 set in The Royal Borough of Kensington and Chelsea.

History
Originally opened by the Hammersmith and City Railway on 13 June 1864, the station was originally named Notting Hill. With the extension of that line from Paddington to Hammersmith it was renamed Notting Hill & Ladbroke Grove in 1880 and Ladbroke Grove (North Kensington) on 1 June 1919 before acquiring the present name in 1938. The renamings were efforts to avoid confusion with the opening of Notting Hill Gate tube station, which had occurred in 1868. The station is named after the street of the same name, where its main entrance is located.

The station is the nearest to Portobello Road Market and market traders and shopkeepers in the market have started a campaign to have the station renamed Portobello Road in an effort to strengthen recognition of the market's proximity.

In 2009, because of financial constraints, TfL decided to stop work on a project to provide step-free access at Ladbroke Grove and five other stations, on the grounds that these are relatively quiet stations and some are already one or two stops away from an existing step-free station. Ladbroke Grove is two stops away from Wood Lane which has step-free access. The project at Ladbroke Grove would have provided two new lifts to platform level and a new step-free entrance.  £3.06 million was spent on Ladbroke Grove before the project was halted.

Gallery

See also
 Planned Crossrail station

References

External links

London Transport Museum Photographic Archive

Lily Allen video on YouTube  Video featuring Ladbroke Grove tube station (1 min 54 - 2 min).

Circle line (London Underground) stations
Hammersmith & City line stations
Tube stations in the Royal Borough of Kensington and Chelsea
Buildings and structures in Notting Hill
Former Hammersmith and City Railway stations
Railway stations in Great Britain opened in 1864
North Kensington
Ladbroke Grove